White Tiger (Hector Ayala) is a fictional character appearing in American comic books published by Marvel Comics. He was created by Bill Mantlo and George Pérez. A Puerto Rican, White Tiger was the first Latin American main character in the history of American comics and Marvel's first Hispanic superhero. The first member of his family to hold the mantle, Hector is the uncle of Angela del Toro and the brother of Ava Ayala.

Design and creation
When the decision to make the White Tiger the main character of Deadly Hands of Kung Fu, with the Sons of the Tigers as supporting characters, Bill Mantlo intended to adequately depict the “gritty/city slums” of New York City. Believing that, due to being Puerto Rican, George Pérez had “intimate knowledge” of the daily life in the South Bronx during the 1970s, he approached the artist with a proposal to create a “character that reflects that grim reality”. Due to the monochromatic style of Deadly Hands of Kung Fu, the initial concept for White Tiger’s costume was simply Spider-Man’s suit “without any detail”. With this idea, Pérez designed the visual aspect of the character, to the satisfaction of both as it was considered elegant and worked well within the constraints of the palette. 

The artist stated that the socially-conscious Mantlo “was probably more aware of the significance of creating the first Latino Super Hero” headliner and described the process of creating White Tiger as “organic” due to his background. Pérez named that character after some of his “neighborhood friends”, gave it a face reminiscent of his brother David and a mother based on his own. The artist illustrated the character’s surroundings based on his own experiences in the inner city. The “streamlined” look was meant to emphasize the word “white” and accommodate it to the format, but Pérez later grew to regret not adding stripes to the design. The move set in his illustrations was composed by “exaggerated” martial arts. Upon revisiting Ayala in 2021, Daniel José Older noted that he would not italicize words “when [slipping] back and forth [between Spanish and English] seamlessly”. The author based his story on an essay that he had written for The New York Times titled “Garbage Fires for Freedom: When Puerto Rican Activists Took Over New York’s Streets”.

Publication history
White Tiger first appeared in Deadly Hands of Kung Fu #19 (December 1975). Following his debut in Deadly Hands of Kung Fu #19, the character subsequently appears in The Deadly Hands of Kung Fu #20-24 (January–May 1976), #26-27 (July–August 1976), #29-32 (October 1976-January 1977), The Spectacular Spider-Man #9-10 (August–September 1977), Human Fly #8-9 (April–May 1978), The Spectacular Spider-Man #18-21 (May–August 1978), The Defenders #62-64 (August–October 1978), The Spectacular Spider-Man #22-23 (September–October 1978), #25-26 (December 1978-January 1979), #29-31 (April–June 1979), #51-52 (February–March 1981), Spidey Super Stories #57 (March 1982), Daredevil #38-40 (December 2002-February 2003), and Daredevil #69 (March 2005).

White Tiger received an entry in the original Official Handbook of the Marvel Universe #14. He appeared as part of the "Sons of the Tiger" entry in the Official Handbook of the Marvel Universe Deluxe Edition #12. White Tiger received his own entry in the Official Handbook of the Marvel Universe Master Edition #11. Ayala is featured in the one-shot Marvel's Voices: Comunidades #1 (October 2021) in a story titled “Pa'lante Juntos”, while his legacy is further explored in another featuring Ava named “Legados”. He reappears in Marvel's Voices: Community Vol. 2 #1 (September 2022) as a flashback character in “Secret Savior”.

Fictional character biography
Hector Ayala was born in San Juan, Puerto Rico.  As a college student at New York's Empire State University, he discovered the tiger amulets that were formerly worn and thrown away by the Sons of the Tiger.  Donning all three amulets, he transformed into the superhuman White Tiger.  He discovered that wearing all the pendants at once increased his strength and gave him nearly superhuman skill in the martial arts.

In his alter-ego, Ayala went into action for the first time against a street gang. He then battled the Prowler, who believed him to be a murderer. The White Tiger battled the Jack of Hearts who also believed him to be behind his father's murder. The White Tiger fought off unnamed costumed assailants of the Corporation crime cartel, who were threatening his sister and Jack of Hearts. Alongside Jack of Hearts, Shang-Chi, and Iron Fist, the White Tiger fought Stryke and other agents of the Corporation, and learned his brother Filippo was attempting to find employment with Fu Manchu. Hector then encountered the Sons of the Tiger.

Ayala was impersonated by Professor Vasquez, and battled Spider-Man in the confusion. Ayala's secret identity was later publicly exposed in a battle with the villainous Lightmaster. Alongside Spider-Man and Daredevil, he then battled the Masked Marauder, Darter, and Carrion. Ayala was later gunned down by Gideon Mace and nearly killed. He was operated upon to remove the bullets, and recovered. Having gained an unhealthy psychological and physical addiction to the tiger amulets, Hector abandoned his identity as the White Tiger. He gave the amulets to a private detective nicknamed Blackbyrd, who returned them to the Sons of the Tiger. Hector then moved out west with his girlfriend Holly Gillis.

After a while, the call to don the amulets and fight evil became too strong and Hector once again became the White Tiger. Soon after, Hector was wrongly accused of murder and convicted despite the efforts of his lawyer, Matt Murdock (a.k.a. Daredevil). Ayala was shot dead trying to escape, shortly before evidence emerged that belatedly proved his innocence.

Family legacy
Angela Del Toro, Hector's niece and an FBI agent, inherited the Jade Tiger amulets. Angela quit the FBI to understand the amulets, and was trained in the use of their powers by Daredevil, becoming the latest person to assume the White Tiger identity before being killed by the Hand and resurrected as their servant. Having been healed by Black Tarantula, she joined Daredevil in the Hand.

Hector's teenage sister Ava Ayala later appeared as the new White Tiger.

Powers and abilities
As the White Tiger, Hector wore the three mystical tiger amulets (a head and two paws), which were green in some versions and yellow in the others, from the extra-dimensional realm of K'un-L'un, which were originally worn by the Sons of the Tiger (Abe Brown, Bob Diamond, and Lin Sun). When wearing the amulets, Hector's physical strength, speed, stamina, agility, dexterity, reflexes & reactions, coordination, balance, and endurance were all enhanced, although not to the point of being invincible. The amulet also conferred on him the experience and abilities of a master martial artist. The White Tiger only possessed his enhanced abilities when wearing all three mystical tiger amulets, which enemies took advantage of.

Other versions

House of M
In the House of M reality, Hector is captured by the Brotherhood who threaten his family. He sends his family to South America and sends his amulet to Angela Del Toro in the mail.

MC2
Hector Ayala appears as White Tiger in the MC2 reality.

Ultimate Spider-Man
The Hector Ayala incarnation of White Tiger appears in the Ultimate Spider-Man animated television series episode "Kraven the Hunter". This incarnation of Hector is depicted as the second White Tiger and the father of Ava Ayala rather than her brother. After he was killed by Kraven the Hunter, his mantle passed to his daughter.

Cultural impact and legacy

Critical reception and influence
Regarding the introduction of the character, Ralph Macchio has stated that “in the '70s, it was quite an event to introduce a Hispanic super hero, and Hector Ayala, the White Tiger, was at the forefront.” Upon release, the character served as inspiration for The Ibis writer Dave Schmidtt to reflect about the role of superheroes as a tool for the escapist, inherently being a figure with the power to change reality in ways that common people can’t. Javier Hernández, cartoonist and co-founder of the Latino Comic Export, cites Hector Ayala as the fist superhero that he identified with as a Latin American. Barbara F. Tobolowsky and Pauline J. Reynolds emphasize that the inclusion of Ayala and other characters in The Amazing Spider-Man made the publication more diverse, but that it still tapped into “fearful white stereotypes” when it came to protest storylines.

In 2016, Jon Huertas played Hector Ayala in an independent short film titled White Tiger, which was produced by WestSide Stories Productions. The actor noted that it is his “favorite Marvel character and the one I’ve always related to the most”, arguing that the protect was born from a necessity “for someone to develop an adult [Hispanic] male comic character”. After working on Marvel's Voices, Older asserted that as the “first Latinx Super Hero, White Tiger holds such an integral and iconic status in comic book history” and commented on the importance of the introduction of Ayala by saying that it filled the void of children “growing up as [Latino nerds] not having people who looked like [them] on the page and [wondering] ‘where are we?”.

In retrospective, comic author and artist J. Gonzo considers White Tiger's introduction important as it marked the appearance of a complex Latin American character, but noted that in subsequent appearances Marvel pushed the character to the background and ultimately failed to truly bring him to the mainstream, a pattern that was repeated with other Hispanic superheroes.

Literary studies
In Teaching comics by and about Latinos/as, Frederick Luis Aldama places the introduction of the White Tiger as the moment where Latino superheroes were given more complex aspects to their characters. He also lists him among the Latin American superheroes that got “slipstreamed” as opposed to be pushed into the mainstream. In 2018, Marc DiPaolo argued a similar point, saying that Héctor Ayala began a trend of depicting them than just stereotypes, a pattern that continued during the 1970s. As part of an analysis in literary studies, Santiago Rubiano Velandia concludes that Ayala and other contemporaries are important for study, since they perpetuate the American stereotype that Latinos are predominantly devout Catholics.

In All New, All Different?’s fourth chapter “Guess Who’s Coming to Save You? The Rise of the Ethnic Superhero in the 1960s and 1970s” Allan W Austin and Patrick L Hamilton explore White Tiger’s introduction within the context of superheroes of several cultural backgrounds. In Death Representations in Literature: Forms and Theories, Adriana Teodorescu uses the murder of his family as a case study to establish the vulnerability that superheroes face when their secret identities are exposed.

Sociological studies
As the first Latin American super hero to make it to the mainstream of American comics, the character of Ayala has been the focus of investigation concerning the representation of Hispanics in the media. One such example is Luis Saenz De Viguera Erkiaga’s Tigre Blanco, héroe del Barrio!: Living and Dying Latina/o in a Superhero World, where the author examines the sociological context of Puerto Rican’s in New York during the 1970s, how they were marginalized as a group and how Hollywood represented them as negative stereotypes. The characterization of Ayala before becoming White Tiger does not escape these clichés, as its internal monologue and vocal expressions are carried out bilingually and he is depicted as “passive” and “the useless son [of] hard working, humble Puerto Ricans [who] spends his time] loitering in dark alleys by himself.”

Despite this, the tendency to speak in “Spanglish”, a combination of broken Spanish (which did not accurately reflect Puerto Rican Spanish) and colloquial English, turned the character in a “pioneer for future Latina/o superheroes”. Ultimately, Saenz considers this characterization as failing to accurately reflect the Nuyorican community and as problematic, since it tries to be “a positive representation of minorities, in spite of all these problems [thus reaffirming] hegemonic views on Puerto Ricans.” He identifies the post-mortem depictions of the character as an attempt to turn this depiction to that of “a role model for Latina/o characters [and a] an honorable, inspirational figure“ in an effort to veer away from the initial stereotype and re-imagine it from current standards. In A Choice of Weapons: The X-Men and the Metaphor for Approaches to Racial Inequality, Gregory S Parks, Matthew Hughey agree about the character’s original depiction being a reflection of American stereotypes.

References

External links
 
 

Characters created by Bill Mantlo
Characters created by George Pérez
Comics characters introduced in 1975
Puerto Rican superheroes
Marvel Comics martial artists
Marvel Comics mutates
Marvel Comics male superheroes
White Tiger (comics)